Tricia Saunders (born as Patricia McNaughton; February 21, 1966 in Ann Arbor, Michigan) is an American amateur wrestler and pioneer in the sport of Women's Freestyle Wrestling. She earned a total of five FILA Wrestling World Championships medals, four gold and one silver. Throughout her career she never lost to an American, and collected eleven national titles.

She was the first woman to be inducted to the National Wrestling Hall of Fame and Museum in Stillwater, Oklahoma and the first American woman to be inducted into the FILA International Wrestling Hall of Fame in Istanbul, Turkey.

Youth
Saunders's grandfather was an All-American wrestler at the University of Michigan in 1930; her father, and her older brother, Jamie, were also grapplers.  As a child, she would accompany her brothers to practice.  Tricia then seven, announced she was bored with watching. Her father asked if she wanted to wrestle and she replied with a yes.  In her first tournament, at nine years old, she won seven of her nine matches, all against boys. By the time she reached the "Regional Nationals", she was a force to be reckoned with in the 50-pound weight class.

Saunders appeared as a featured guest on a 1975 episode of the syndicated version of To Tell The Truth.

She retired wrestling boys in folkstyle wrestling at age 12, compiling a record of 181-23.  She later turned to freestyle wrestling, this time wrestling women internationally, after receiving her undergraduate degree from the University of Wisconsin, ten years later.

Wrestling

Tricia Saunders won the 1992 World Wrestling Championships in Villerbanne, France, competing at 103.5 lbs, the first American woman to win a World title.  She won the silver medal at the 1993 World Championship, and three more Gold medals at the 1996, 1998, and 1999 Worlds, the most World titles of any American woman.

In 2006, Saunders became the first woman to be inducted as a Distinguished Member of the National Wrestling Hall of Fame.  In 2011, she was inducted into the United World Wrestling Hall of Fame.

Retirement
Saunders became one of the first coaches of the U.S. Women's Olympic Wrestling Team at the 2004 Summer Games in Athens.

Saunders is the namesake of the Tricia Saunders High School Excellence Award, given by the National Wrestling Hall of Fame.  The award honors the most outstanding high school seniors in women's wrestling.  Criteria include wrestling accomplishments, scholastic achievement, and community service.

Personal
Tricia is married to Townsend Saunders, the 1996 Olympic freestyle wrestling silver medalist. They have three children, two daughters, Tassia and Tatiana and a son, Townsend.

References

External links
 Tricia Saunders - Distinguished Member at the National Wrestling Hall of Fame
 Tricia Saunders (USA) - Lutte Féminine - FILA Hall of Fame at the International Federation of Associated Wrestling Styles (FILA)

1966 births
American female sport wrestlers
Living people
Sportspeople from Ann Arbor, Michigan
University of Wisconsin–Madison alumni
21st-century American women